The clitoral crura (singular: clitoral crux) are two erectile tissue structures, which together form a V-shape. Crus is a Latin word that means "leg". Each "leg" of the V converges on the clitoral body. At each divergent point is a corpus cavernosum of clitoris. The crura are attached to the pubic arch, and are adjacent to the 
vestibular bulbs. The crura flank the urethra, urethral sponge, and vagina and extend back toward the pubis. Each clitoral crus connects to the rami of the pubis and the ischium.

During sexual arousal, the crura become engorged with blood, as does all of the erectile tissue of the clitoris.

The clitoral crura are each covered by an ischiocavernosus muscle.

See also
 Crus of penis

References

External links
  - "The Female Perineum: The Clitoris"

Clitoris